Guido Basso  (27 September 1937 – 13 February 2023) was a Canadian jazz musician who was a member of Rob McConnell's Boss Brass big band. He was a trumpeter, flugelhornist, arranger, composer, and conductor.

Early life
Guido Basso was born in Montreal, Quebec, on 27 September 1937. He grew up in the Little Italy neighbourhood of Montreal, in an Italian-Canadian family. He began playing the trumpet at the age of nine. He studied at the Conservatoire de musique du Québec à Montréal. His professional music career started in his teens, under the name "Stubby Basso".

During his early-20s, Basso performed regularly at the El Morocco in Montreal, and played in bands led by Maury Kaye. Singer Vic Damone discovered Basso playing at the El Morocco, then included him on a tour from 1957 to 1958.

Career
Basso had a professional career as a composer, conductor, arranger, trumpeter, flugelhornist, and harmonica player. The Canadian Encyclopedia wrote that Basso was "one of Canada's pre-eminent jazz trumpeters", and that "he was credited with the theory that one attacks the trumpet and makes love to a flugelhorn".

In 1958, he joined singer Pearl Bailey and her husband, drummer Louis Bellson, touring North America with them and their orchestra. Basso returned to Canada and settled in Toronto in 1961, instead of obtaining permanent residency in the United States and the likelihood of required enlistment in the United States Army. Basso then studied at The Royal Conservatory of Music during the early 1960s.

In 1963, he became music director for CBLT's Nightcap, a job he held until 1967. He subsequently held a number of music director positions with the Canadian Broadcasting Corporation (CBC), as well as being active as a performer. His work at CBC included Barris and Company (1968–69), Mallets and Brass (1969) with vibraphonist Peter Appleyard, music director of After Noon (1969–1971), and leading orchestras playing big band music on 'In the Mood (1971–72) and Bandwagon (1972–73).

He organized and led big band concerts at the CNE Bandshell, featuring Dizzy Gillespie, Quincy Jones, Woody Herman, Benny Goodman, Count Basie and Duke Ellington. Basso was a charter member of Rob McConnell's Boss Brass, playing with the band for over twenty years. Basso also played in big bands led by Ron Collier, and Phil Nimmons.

Personal life
Basso was married to Kristin, and had one daughter, Mia Basso Noble, who was a musician and songwriter. Mia died of cancer in September 2013.

Basso died in Toronto, on 13 February 2023, at age 85.

Awards and honours
Basso was made a member of the Order of Canada in 1994. His citation cited him as, "an advocate of the arts and an inspiration to young musicians, he is generous with his time and talent, running workshops and clinics, and lending his name and expertise to worthy causes". He received the Queen Elizabeth II Golden Jubilee Medal in 2002, and the Queen Elizabeth II Diamond Jubilee Medal in 2012.

Basso won the Juno Award for traditional jazz album of the year, Turn Out the Stars, in 2003. and a second Juno Award for traditional jazz album of the year, Lost in the Stars, in 2004.

Discography

Albums as a leader or member
Albums as a leader or member:
 Guido Basso (Innovation, 1986)
 Bass Busters (Innovative, 1995)
 Midnight Martini (Justin Time, 1999)
 Dedications (Justin Time, 2002)
 A Lazy Afternoon (Justin Time, 2003)
 Lost in the Stars (CBC, 2003)
 One Take, Vol. 1 (Alma, 2005)

With Rob McConnell
 1976 The Jazz Album
 1978 Big Band Jazz
 1980 Present Perfect
 1981 Live in Digital
 1982 All in Good Time
 1984 Old Friends, New Music
 1985 Boss Brass & Woods
 1986 Mel Tormé, Rob McConnell and the Boss Brass
 1991 The Brass Is Back
 1992 Brassy and Sassy
 1992 Live in Digital
 1993 Our 25th Year
 1994 Overtime
 1995 Don't Get Around Much Anymore
 1997 Play the Jazz Classics
 2000 The Rob McConnell Tentet
 2002 Riffs I Have Known
 2003 Music of the Twenties

Albums as a guest artist
With Anne Murray
 1993 Croonin' 
 2002 Country Croonin' 
 2004 I'll Be Seeing You
 2005 All of Me

With Emilie-Claire Barlow
 2001 Tribute
 2005 Like a Lover

With Holly Cole
 2001 Baby, It's Cold Outside
 2003 Shade

With Sophie Milman
 2004 Sophie Milman
 2007 Make Someone Happy
 2009 Take Love Easy

With others
 1977 Peter Appleyard Presents, Peter Appleyard
 1979 Back Again, The Hi-Lo's
 1986 Night Flight, Sammy Nestico
 1994 Masterpieces, The Singers Unlimited
 1995 Velvet & Brass, Mel Tormé
 1996 From Lush to Lively, Oliver Jones
 1996 You Must Believe in Swing, Ranee Lee
 2005 A Dream Come True, Trudy Desmond
 2006 I Love Being Here with You, Dione Taylor
 2007 From Sea to Sky, Laila Biali
 2008 The Other Woman, Chantal Chamberland

References

External links
 
 
 Article at thecanadianencyclopedia.ca

1937 births
2023 deaths
20th-century Canadian male musicians
20th-century trumpeters
21st-century Canadian male musicians
21st-century trumpeters
Big band trumpet players
Canadian harmonica players
Canadian jazz trumpeters
Canadian male jazz musicians
Canadian people of Italian descent
Conservatoire de musique du Québec à Montréal alumni
Juno Award for Traditional Jazz Album of the Year winners
Male trumpeters
Members of the Order of Canada
Musicians from Montreal
The Royal Conservatory of Music alumni